Lampman is a surname. Notable people with this surname include:
Archibald Lampman, Canadian poet
Archibald Lampman Award, an award named after Archibald Lampman
Bryce Lampman, American ice hockey player
Ben Hur Lampman, American newspaper editor
Harry Lampman, Canadian football player
Jake Lampman, American football player
Mike Lampman, Canadian-born American ice hockey player
Robert Lampman, American economist

See also
Lampman, a city in Saskatchewan, Canada
Lampman Airport, an airport in Lampman
Lampman/Spitfire Air Aerodrome, an aerodrome in Lampman
Ronald Lampman Watts, Canadian academic
William Lampman House, a house in Catskill, New York